Charlie Cassang (born 8 February 1995) is a French rugby union player. His position is scrum-half and he currently plays for Clermont in the Top 14.

References

External links
Clermont profile 

1995 births
Living people
French rugby union players
ASM Clermont Auvergne players
Rugby union scrum-halves